Berneung TopkingBoxing is a Thai Muay Thai fighter. He is a three time WPMF world champion, two time WPMF interim champion, and a WMC world champion.

Titles and accomplishments
Muay Thai

 World Professional Muaythai Federation
 2014 WPMF World Interim -76.2 kg / Super Middleweight Champion
 2014 WPMF World -76.2 kg / Super Middleweight Champion
 2013 WPMF World Interim -76.2 kg / Super Middleweight Champion
 2013 WPMF World -72.5 kg / Middleweight Champion
 2013 WPMF World -76.2 kg / Super Middleweight Champion
 World Muaythai Council
 2014 WMC World -76.2 kg / Super Middleweight Champion

Fight record

|- style="background:#fbb;"
| 2016-02-14 || Loss ||align=left| Thomas Carpenter || Max Muay Thai || Pattaya, Thailand || KO || 2 ||
|-  style="background:#fbb;"
| 2015-07-04|| Loss ||align=left| Yohan Lidon || MFC 2 || France || TKO || 4 ||
|-
! style=background:white colspan=9 |
|-  style="background:#fbb;"
| 2015-04-01 || Loss ||align=left| Adrien Rubis || WPMF Event || Bangkok, Thailand || Decision (Split) || 5 || 3:00
|-
! style=background:white colspan=9 |
|-  style="background:#cfc;"
| 2014-12-04 || Win ||align=left| Adrien Rubis || King's Birthday || Bangkok, Thailand || Decision || 5 || 3:00
|-
! style=background:white colspan=9 |
|-  style="background:#cfc;"
| 2014-10-31 || Win ||align=left| Florian Breau || Toyota Marathon || Thailand || KO (Right Cross) || 2 ||
|-  style="background:#cfc;"
| 2014-04-04 || Win ||align=left| Yohan Lidon || Warriors Night 3 || Paris, France || Decision || 5 || 3:00
|-  style="background:#cfc;"
| 2014-06-14 || Win ||align=left| Abdallah Mabel || Monte Carlo Fighting Masters 2014 || Monte Carlo, Monaco || TKO (injury) || 3 || 
|-
! style=background:white colspan=9 |
|- style="background:#cfc;"
| 2013-12-04 || Win ||align=left| Tobias Alexandersson || King's Birthday || Bangkok, Thailand || Decision || 5 || 3:00
|-
! style=background:white colspan=9 |
|- style="background:#cfc;"
| 2013-08-11 || Win ||align=left| Raphaël Llodra|| Queen's Cup || Bangkok, Thailand || Decision || 5 || 3:00 
|-
! style=background:white colspan=9 |
|- style="background:#cfc;"
| 2013-06-14 || Win ||align=left| Tobias Alexandersson || Muaythai Superfight || Pattaya, Thailand || TKO || 4 || 
|-
! style=background:white colspan=9 |
|-  style="background:#fbb;"
| 2013-05-06 || Loss ||align=left| Enriko Kehl || Thailand vs Europe 2013 || Ulm, Germany || KO (Spinning Elbow) || 4 ||
|- style="background:#cfc;"
| 2013-03-11 || Win ||align=left| Thomas Carpenter || Lad Krabang || Thailand || Decision || 5 || 3:00
|-
! style=background:white colspan=9 |
|-  style="background:#fbb;"
| 2012-11-25 || Loss ||align=left| Enriko Gogokhia|| Thai Boxe Mania - 2012 || Torino, Italia || Decision || 3 || 3:00
|- style="background:#cfc;"
| 2012-09-22 || Win ||align=left| Chanachai Kaewsamrit || Bali Muaythai Grand Match 2012 || Bali, Indonesia || TKO (Broken Arm) || 3 ||
|- style="background:#fbb;"
| 2012-08-11 || Loss ||align=left| Tobias Alexandersson || Queen's Birthday || Bangkok, Thailand || Decision || 5 || 3:00
|-
! style=background:white colspan=9 |
|- style="background:#cfc;"
| 2011-07-23 || Win ||align=left| Manasak Sitniwat || Thailand vs Challenger 2011 || Bangkok, Thailand || KO (Left Uppercut) || 2 ||
|-  style="background:#fbb;"
| 2010-03-25 || Loss ||align=left|  Yohan Lidon || Planet Battle || Hong-Kong, China || Decision || 5 || 3:00
|- style="background:#cfc;"
| 2009-08-31 || Win ||align=left| Komkaew || Patong Boxing Stadium || Patong, Thailand || KO (Right Body Kick) || 2 ||
|- style="background:#cfc;"
| 2009-05-09 || Win ||align=left| Namsaknoi Yudthagarngamtorn|| Royal Cup Of Kedah || Malaysia || Decision || 5 || 3:00
|-  style="background:#fbb;"
| 2009-03-14 || Loss ||align=left|  Vladimír Moravčík || Gala Night Thaiboxing || Žilina, Slovakia || Decision (Majority) || 5 || 3:00
|-  style="background:#fbb;"
| 2009-02-14 || Loss ||align=left| Vagif Abdullaev || Surgut || Surgut, Russia || Decision (Split) || 5 || 3:00
|- style="background:#cfc;"
| 2009-02-05 || Win ||align=left| || Patong Boxing Stadium || Patong, Thailand || KO (Right Uppercut and Left Hook) || 2 ||
|- style="background:#cfc;"
| 2008-08-30 || Win ||align=left| Farkrut || Battle of Champions || Malaysia || KO (Right Cross) || 3 ||
|- style="background:#cfc;"
| 2008-07-25 || Win ||align=left| Namsaknoi Yudthagarngamtorn|| Bangla Stadium || Patong, Thailand || Decision || 5 || 3:00
|- style="background:#cfc;"
| 2008-07-17 || Win ||align=left| Komkiat || Patong Boxing Stadium || Patong, Thailand || KO (Right Cross) || 2 ||
|-  style="background:#fbb;"
| 2007-03-24 || Loss ||align=left| Saiyok Pumpanmuang || Rajadamnern Stadium || Bangkok, Thailand || TKO || 5 || 
|-
! style=background:white colspan=9 |
|-  style="background:#fbb;"
| 2007-03-15 || Loss ||align=left| Saiyok Pumpanmuang || Daowrungchujarern Fights, Rajadamnern Stadium || Bangkok, Thailand || Decision || 5 || 3:00
|-  style="background:#fbb;"
| 2006-08-17 || Loss ||align=left| Saiyok Pumpanmuang || Daorungchujaroen Fights, Rajadamnern Stadium || Bangkok, Thailand || TKO (Low kicks) || 4 || 
|-
! style=background:white colspan=9 |
|- style="background:#cfc;"
| 2006-06-05 || Win ||align=left| Kaluhard Aikchumpon ||Daorungchujarean, Rajadamnern Stadium || Bangkok, Thailand || Decision || 5 || 3:00
|- style="background:#cfc;"
| 2004-05-17 || Win ||align=left| Jakkawanlak Saktevan ||Daorungchujarean, Rajadamnern Stadium || Bangkok, Thailand || Decision || 5 || 3:00
|- style="background:#cfc;"
| 2004-04-14 || Win ||align=left| Duanesarn Kiatsarika ||Daorungchujarean, Rajadamnern Stadium || Bangkok, Thailand || Decision || 5 || 3:00
|-  style="background:#fbb;"
| 2004-02-23 || Loss ||align=left| Big Ben Chor Praram 6 || Daorungchujarean + Jarumueang Fights, Rajadamnern Stadium || Bangkok, Thailand || Decision (Unanimous) || 5 || 3:00
|- style="background:#cfc;"
| 2004-01-01 || Win ||align=left| Teapparit Sitkuanaim || Daorungchujarean + Jarumueang Fights, Rajadamnern Stadium || Bangkok, Thailand || Decision || 5 || 3:00
|-  style="background:#c5d2ea"
| 2003-12-11 || Draw ||align=left| Big Ben Chor Praram 6 || SUK Daorungchujarean, Rajadamnern Stadium || Bangkok, Thailand || Decision draw || 5 || 3:00
|-  style="background:#fbb;"
| 2003-09-29 || Loss ||align=left| Jakawanlak Saktewan ||SUK Daorungchujarean, Rajadamnern Stadium || Bangkok, Thailand || Decision || 5 || 3:00
|- style="background:#cfc;"
| 2003-08-27 || Win ||align=left| Big Ben Chor Praram 6 || SUK Daorungchujarean, Rajadamnern Stadium || Bangkok, Thailand || Decision || 5 || 3:00
|-
| colspan=9 | Legend:

Lethwei record

|- style="background:#fbb;"
| 2016-10-09 || Loss || align="left" | Too Too|| GTG International Challenge Fights 2016 || Yangon, Myanmar || KO (Punches) || 3 || 
|- style="background:#c5d2ea;" |-
| 2015-02-04 || Draw || align="left" | Tun Tun Min || 68th Mon National Day || Ye Township, Myanmar || Draw || 5 ||
|-
| colspan=9 | Legend:

References

Berneung TopkingBoxing
Berneung TopkingBoxing
Living people
1983 births